Cussons is an English surname which may refer to:

People 
 Alexander Stockton Cussons (1914–1986), British soap manufacturer
 Alexander Tom Cussons (1875–1951), British soap manufacturer 
 Leslie Cussons (1907–1963), British soap manufacturer 
 Sheila Cussons (1922–2004), South African poet 
 Thomas Tomlinson Cussons (1838–1927), British chemist

Other uses 
 PZ Cussons, a British-based soap manufacturing company 
 PZ Cussons Ghana
 PZ Cussons Nigeria Plc

See also 
 Cusson (disambiguation)